The Pospeshil Theatre in Bloomfield, Nebraska was built in 1906.  It was listed on the National Register of Historic Places in 1988, and was delisted in 2019.

It was a two-part commercial block building that was located at the northwest corner of Grant St. and S. Broadway. It was "utilitarian in appearance" except for having "red brick arches over its windows and red brick ridges along the top of the building."

The building was deemed significant in the area of social history and performing arts history of Nebraska.

It was identified as one of 25 Nebraska historic opera house buildings worthy of intensive study in a 1988 review.

The building burned down; Bloomfield's public library was built in 2000 on the former site.

References

Theatres on the National Register of Historic Places in Nebraska
Buildings and structures completed in 1906
Buildings and structures in Knox County, Nebraska
Former buildings and structures in Nebraska
Former National Register of Historic Places in Nebraska
1906 establishments in Nebraska